Sober, is a municipality in the Spanish province of Lugo.

External links

Official website

Municipalities in the Province of Lugo